Joachim Meischner (born 13 August 1946 in Zwönitz) is a retired East German biathlete.

He represented the sports club SG Dynamo Zinnwald / Sportvereinigung (SV) Dynamo. He won the bronze medal at the Winter Olympics in Sapporo 1972.

References 

1946 births
Living people
German male biathletes
Biathletes at the 1972 Winter Olympics
Olympic biathletes of East Germany
Olympic bronze medalists for East Germany
Olympic medalists in biathlon
Medalists at the 1972 Winter Olympics
People from Erzgebirgskreis
Sportspeople from Saxony